Daisy Belmore (30 June 1874 – 12 December 1954) was an English stage and film actress. Born in England, Belmore moved to the United States in 1910 where she settled, achieving citizenship in 1939 and fame as a leading stage actress, as well as on film. Her career started at the age of 8 and following a break to complete her education, she returned to stage aged 15, touring the world with the Wilson Barrett company to countries including America, Australia and India. Her godmother was Ellen Terry, who was among the most famous actresses of her time.

She first visited the United States in 1910 to appear in the musical comedy Our Miss Gibbs, produced by Charles Frohman and would later work with William Faversham. Her breakthrough role came in 1921 as the character of Old Sweetheart in Three Live Ghosts, as a "gin drinking lovable old mother" which earned her much praise and she was barely recognised in the street following her character's appearance transformation. She was later part of a "strong cast" for the 1928 silent film We Americans and was part of the supporting cast of My Past in 1931, alongside stars including Joan Blondell and Virginia Sale. Belmore helped arrange acting classes in Shakespearean drama for Nellie Bramley, an upcoming Australian stage actress.

She married Melbourne-born Samuel Waxman in 1902 had 2 children, Eric and Ruth, before their separation in 1923 and his death in 1942. Her daughter was also a stage actress and musician, sometimes appearing alongside her mother. One of her brothers was director Lionel Belmore. Belmore died in her apartment at the Wellington Hotel in December 1954 due to a heart attack.

Early life
Belmore was born on 30 June 1874 and baptised on 27 September 1874 in St Marylebone, Westminster, England as Daisy Gertrude Garstin. Her parents were George Benjamin Garstin and Alice Maud Mary Ann Garstin and she was one of seven children. Her godmother was Ellen Terry, who was among the most famous actresses of her time. Belmore did not believe she resembled her mother and in her opinion, took after her father who was a prominent comedian and acted alongside his friend Sir Henry Irving.

Career

19th century

Belmore's career started at around the age of 8 and by 15, she was a leading comedienne, touring the world and played in repertoire with Wilson Barrett's company, with whom she had been with since the start of her career. In her earlier years, she would play child parts alongside her brother and together they played in The Silver King. During this time, she recalled how her mother would play the "heavy character" parts, while her older sister would play comedian roles and her sister's husband would play other character roles. She took time out of acting to attend school and returned to the stage at the age of 15. Recalling her first acting part, she had just two sentences to speak and entered the stage "with my knees quaking under me", yet could only whisper when expected to speak. Upon returning to her dressing room, her mother suggested that she give up on any thought of being a stage actress, believing that she had "no voice and absolutely no gifts for it", noting that for her to continue would risk disgrace to their family name and reputation.

As part of the Wilson Barrett Company, she toured the world, visiting America several times and in 1898, toured Australia for the first time. She praised the Australian audiences as being enthusiastic and knowing when to laugh or not, depending on the seriousness of the scene.

20th century

During a tour of Australia in 1901, Belmore played Dacia in The Sign of the Cross. She came to the United States in 1910, having sailed from Southampton, England and arriving in New York on 29 July 1910, to appear in the musical comedy Our Miss Gibbs which was produced by Charles Frohman. Following a period working under Frohman, she later worked with William Faversham in a 1911 production of The Faun, alongside her brothers.

In 1921, she had the biggest hit of her career to date in Three Live Ghosts, playing the character Old Sweetheart, a "gin drinking lovable old mother" which earned her much praise "for her skillful work as the old lady with a mercenary mind". Belmore had to disfigure her appearance for the role, as she was known for her good looks which was not in keeping with her character. Her appearance was so transformative that she was seldom recognised in the street by those who had seen the play, with her feeling concerned that people may have believed her disfigured looks to be natural.

She visited Australia again in 1927, the first time in 17 years since she found fame in America, having resided in New York continuously during that time. Upon her return to Australia, she remarked how the progress Sydney had made during her time away was "simply marvellous". Belmore was considered as having a "rare quality of mature judgement" with frank opinions, noted during an interview she gave during her stay in Australia. In 1928, she was part of a "strong cast" for the silent film We Americans, starred in the drama film Seven Days Leave in 1930 and in 1931, was part of the supporting cast of My Past, alongside known stars such as Joan Blondell and Virginia Sale. Belmore helped train and mentor Nellie Bramley as an upcoming Australian stage actress, helping her practice scene work in Shakespearean drama.

Outside of films, Belmore was also a theatre actress, having directed and toured for 40 weeks with The Vagabond King, the majority of time spent in Chicago. In 1932, she toured with the "largest dramatic road show" in a production of The Apple Cart by George Bernard Shaw. Other plays she appeared in or directed include Angel Street, Best of Spirits, and His Makers.

Her career as an actress and director took her to various countries around the world, including Australia, Africa, and India. By the late 1940s, Belmore was director of New York's American Theater and in 1947, presented Little Women at Huntingdon College as a free public service.

Personal life
Belmore sought American citizenship in December 1939, petitioning in the state of New York, having lived there since July 1910.

Belmore's brother was director Lionel Belmore, who died the year before her in Hollywood in 1953. She also had another brother, Herbert, who had died in 1951. She used to play tennis and football with her brothers during her time in America.

She was married to Melbourne-born Samuel Waxman (April 1869 – March 1942) on 19 April 1902, but they separated in 1923. She had 2 children to Waxman, a boy Eric born in 1905 and a girl Ruth born in 1906. Her daughter was also a stage actress and musician, sometimes appearing alongside her mother, having made her debut at an early age. Belmore measured  in height and had blue eyes.

Death
Belmore died in her apartment at the Wellington Hotel on 12 December 1954, at the age of 80 due to a heart attack.

Selected acting credits

 Bab's Burglar (1917)
 Bab's Matinee Idol (1917)
 Three Live Ghosts (play, 1921)
 The Dancers (play, 1924)
 We Americans (1928)

 Seven Days Leave (1930)
 Alias French Gertie (1930)
 Scarlet Pages (1930)
 Ten Nights in a Bar-Room (1931)
 My Past (1931)

References
Citations

Sources

External links

1874 births
1954 deaths
20th-century American actresses
American film actresses
People with acquired American citizenship
British emigrants to the United States